Markea fosbergii is a species of plant in the family Solanaceae. It is endemic to Ecuador.

References

fosbergii
Endemic flora of Ecuador
Endangered plants
Taxonomy articles created by Polbot